Puerto Rican Chinese cuisine is a popular style of food exclusive to restaurants in Puerto Rico developed by its Chinese immigrants. The food is a variation of Cantonese cuisine with some elements of Puerto Rican cuisine.  A typical dish consists of fried rice, a choice of meat, and French fries.  The fried rice itself varies in every restaurant, but can contain many ingredients such as ham, beef, shrimp, egg, lettuce, and onions.  In 2020, there were an estimated 450 Chinese restaurants in Puerto Rico and the owners suffered discrimination during the COVID-19 pandemic in Puerto Rico.

Dishes
Popular dishes in many Puerto Rican Chinese restaurants are:

 Pollo al Ajillo — Chicken and onion slices in garlic and oil.
 Camarones al Ajillo — Shrimp in garlic and oil.
 Carne Ahumada — Pieces of pork drenched in sweet red sauce.  It is known in American Chinese cuisine as Boneless Pork Ribs.
 Pepper steak — Slices of beef and green pepper in soy sauce-based brown sauce.
 Pepper chicken — Same as pepper steak but with chicken.
 Broccoli chicken — Chicken and broccoli in soy sauce-based brown sauce.
 Sweet and sour chicken
 Fried chicken — Deep-fried breaded chicken that is very popular and inexpensive.
 Chow mein
 Chop suey
 Fried rice
 Egg rolls
 Tostones

Gallery

See also 

 American Chinese cuisine
 Chinese Latin American cuisine
 Caribbean Chinese cuisine

References

Chinese fusion cuisine
Chinese
American Chinese cuisine